The southern chorus frog (Pseudacris nigrita) is a species of frog in the family Hylidae, endemic to the southeastern United States. Its natural habitats are temperate forests, temperate grassland, shrub-dominated wetlands, swamps, freshwater marshes, intermittent freshwater marshes, ponds, open excavations, seasonally flooded agricultural land, and canals and ditches.
It is threatened by habitat loss.

References

Chorus frogs
Taxonomy articles created by Polbot
Amphibians described in 1825